The Shelter is a music venue in Detroit, Michigan. It is located below Saint Andrew's Hall at 431 E. Congress St. A venue of the same name is featured in the film 8 Mile.

Noted Performers

Eminem
John Mayer
All Time Low
Ally Brooke
Big Wreck
Eisley
Daya
Queens of the Stone Age
The Hives
Suicide Silence
Ghostemane
Haley Reinhart
Lil Peep
Local H
Richie Hawtin
Poppy
Local H
Limblifter
Slum Village
Stanford Prison Experiment (band)

James "Jamie" Hembree

References

 

Music venues in Michigan
Buildings and structures in Detroit
Buildings and structures completed in 1908
Live Nation Entertainment
Culture of Detroit